Aalibabayum Aarara Kallanmarum is a 1998 Malayalam comedy film directed by Satheesh Manarkat and Shaji. It stars Jagadeesh, Vijayaraghavan, Jagathy Sreekumar, Kalpana, Kalabhavan Mani, Sai Kumar, Rajan P. Dev, Indrans , Thejas Ramakrishnan

Cast
 Jagadeesh as Divakaran
 Vijayaraghavan as Sub Inspector Jayashankar
 Anju Aravind as Sunitha Divakaran
 Jagathy Sreekumar as Ithikkara Thanku
 Kalpana as Thanki 
 Kalabhavan Mani as Palacharakku Chandy
 Sai Kumar as MLA Jose Parakkan
 Rajan P. Dev as Chathanadan
 Indrans as Advocate Luckose
 Mamukkoya as Head Constable Peeru Muhammed
 Bobby Kottarakkara as Police Constable Kuruvilla
V.D. Rajappan as Gold Gopalan
 Tony as Advocate
 Chali Pala as Udumbu Vasu
Usha T.T. as Sunanda
Poornima Anand as Raji Jayashanker 
Omana Ouseph as Jayashankar's mother
Thrissur Elsy as Chandy's mother
 KPAC Premachandran
Mani C. Kappan
T.S. Raju as Ex MLA
Thejas Ramakrishnan as Luttapi/Tuttu, Ithikkara Thanku's son
Rajesh K Puthumana

Soundtrack 

The songs were composed by Berny–Ignatius.

External links
 

1990s Malayalam-language films
1998 comedy films
1998 films
Films scored by Berny–Ignatius